Solace Ames is an American writer specializing in erotic fiction. She has also written under the pen name Violetta Vane.

Career 
Ames is a self-taught writer. Her short story "Tomorrow's Much Too Long" placed third in Hyphen's first Erotic Writing Contest in 2013.

Ames first published The Dom Project with Carina Press with another author, Heloise Belleau in 2013. The main character was a tall, "tattooed Asian bad-boy Dom."

Ames's first solo book, The Submission Gift, released in 2014, was reviewed by Publishers Weekly, which called it a "nuanced look at polyamory and BDSM." In the story, a husband hires a rent boy as a "gift" to his wife. He does this because he has just recovered from a bad car accident and can't provide a full sex life for his wife any longer.

Her second solo publication, The Companion Contract, released in 2015, was also favorably reviewed by Publishers Weekly. This book is about a woman who works as a pornography actress, but wants to move onto another career and another place in her life.

Ames always makes a point to include safe sex practices in her writing whether this includes using condoms or partners being regularly screened for sexually transmitted infections (STI). When Ames first started writing romance novels, she wanted to create multicultural stories. She says that "Characters aren't as real to me if I don't understand where they come from." Ames also stresses how treating multiculturalism in erotica must be rooted in a sense of personhood, rather than "fetishizing" or objectifying the person for their differences.

Personal life
Ames's father was a Japanese citizen, and her mother was raised in the United States: each had different expectations on how to raise their daughter. Ames has characterized them as "anarcho-hippies". Growing up, Ames felt that she was often fetishized by men who viewed Asian women as sex objects. During her early twenties, she worked in a strip club in order to make money, though she doesn't "talk about it much after because of the stigma".

Ames is married and has children.

Bibliography

References

External links 
 Official site

American women novelists
American writers of Japanese descent
Women erotica writers
21st-century American novelists
21st-century American women writers
Living people
American erotica writers
Year of birth missing (living people)
BDSM writers